Ernie Hawkins (born Ernest Leroy Hawkins, 1947, Pittsburgh, Pennsylvania) is an American acoustic blues guitar player, singer, songwriter, recording artist, and educator.

Hawkins, along with fellow bluesmen Stefan Grossman and Roy Bookbinder, studied with blues legend Reverend Gary Davis in New York City in 1965 and 1966.  Over the years, he learned a variety of styles, including Piedmont blues, Delta blues, ragtime, and gospel.

In 1969, Hawkins moved back to his hometown of Pittsburgh, and enrolled at the University of Pittsburgh, earning a degree in philosophy.  In 1973, he moved to Dallas for graduate school and earned a PhD in phenomenological psychology at the University of Dallas, though he remained active in music, studying and performing with Mance Lipscomb, Robert Pete Williams, Fred McDowell, and Robert "Nyles" Jones.

In 1978, Hawkins decided to put aside his psychology career and become a full-time musician.  In the mid 1980s, He returned to Pittsburgh, and for the next ten years played lead guitar with the local R&B act Gary Belloma and the Blue Bombers.  Over the years, he played with blues musicians Reverend Gary Davis, Son House, Mance Lipscomb, Fred McDowell, Jim Brewer and others, and has been featured in Sing Out!, Fingerstyle Guitar, Dirty Linen, Acoustic Guitar, Blues Revue and Vintage Guitar magazines. He has appeared on A Prairie Home Companion, Mountain Stage, WoodSongs Old-Time Radio Hour and XM Satellite Radio.

Hawkins appeared on Maria Muldaur's Grammy and Blues Music Award nominated album Richland Woman Blues (2001), and was the guitarist for the national support tour.  He lives in Pittsburgh, and continues to perform nationally and internationally and to record, teach, and advocate for blues music.

Discography
Ragtime Signatures, 1980
Blues Advice Orchard, 1996
Bluesified Say Mo', 2000
Mean Little Poodle Say Mo', 2002
Rags and Bones Say Mo', 2005
Whinin' Boy Corona Records, 2010
Monongahela Rye Corona Records, 2014

Awards
Independent Music Awards 2012: "Shuffle Rag" – Best Cover Song

References

External links
Official Website
[ allmusic entry]
Ernie Hawkins interview and music from the CD Whinin' Boy
 Ernie Hawkins -Pittsburgh Music History Profile

1947 births
Living people
American blues guitarists
American male guitarists
American blues singers
Country blues musicians
Fingerstyle guitarists
Musicians from Pittsburgh
University of Pittsburgh alumni
University of Dallas alumni
Singers from Pennsylvania
Guitarists from Pennsylvania
20th-century American guitarists
20th-century American male musicians